Mutilation Mix: Greatest Hits (That Never Were Hits) is a greatest hits album by the American hip hop group Insane Clown Posse. The album consists of excerpts of songs from the group's first three studio albums, as well as some rare, less well-known tracks. Dispersed throughout the music are several recordings of phone messages. The songs were hand-picked by Insane Clown Posse. It is the 2nd compilation album and the 9th overall release by Insane Clown Posse.

Track listing 
 Request #1 (Nate the Mack)
 Cemetery Girl
 Hey Vato
 Wagon Wagon
 Request #2 (Esham)
 Psychopathic
 Southwest Strangla (2 Dope solo)
 Never Had It Made
 Chicken Huntin' (Slaughter House Mix)
 I Stuck Her With My Wang
 The Loons
 Red Neck Hoe
 Request #3 (Charm Farm)
 I'm Coming Home
 Superballs
 The Stalker
 Wizard of The Hood
 Skitsofrantic
 3 Rings
 Request #4 (Harm's Way)
 Murder Go Round
 Request #5 (Daddy X of the Kottonmouth Kings)
 Southwest Song
 Fuck Off!
 Dead Body Man
 Cotton Candy
 17 Dead
 Request #6 [(2 dog)]
 The Neden Game (Album Version)
 House of Wonders + Mike Clark Bitchin'

References 

Self-released albums
1997 compilation albums
Insane Clown Posse compilation albums
Psychopathic Records compilation albums
Horrorcore compilation albums